The Seafox is an anti-mine remotely operated vehicle (ROV) manufactured by German company Atlas Elektronik to locate and destroy ground and moored mines. There are two versions and a training version. The orange Seafox-I "inspection" variant has sonar and an Inertial navigation system, and the black Seafox-C "combat" round has a 1.4 kg shaped charge warhead.  The system is in service with eleven navies across seventy platforms.The SeaFox is an advanced design of an Expendable Mine Disposal Vehicle or EMDV. The SeaFox comes with a control panel to help the user locate and destroy the mines. The SeaFox has a low life cycle cost meaning it has very low maintenance costs and does not cost much to rebuild if destroyed. The main target for the SeaFox is unexploded mines that pose a danger to ships and other vessels that might travel along the route. The SeaFox communicates with the ship via a fiber-optic that connects into a TV for the captain to view the mine. The Seafox also has a special launcher and retrieval system that it uses. Together the console and launcher help navy's around the world conduct damage estimation, route surveys, maritime boundary control, intelligence and harbor surveillance missions. The SeaFox primarily uses a transponder called dead reckoning. Dead reckoning is a pressure sensor on the SeaFox. The Seafox Drone has also been used on the MH-53 helicopter.

Service history
In 2001 the Royal Navy leased some Seafox drones for use on HMS Bangor and HMS Blyth off Iraq as part of Operation Telic. The Bangor also deployed them off Libya in 2011. in October 2015 the Naval Surface Weapons Center (NSWC) commissioned the Atlas North America to get more SeaFox vehicles.

Technical Specifications
The operational depth for the SeaFox C is between 0 meters and 300 meters. The SeaFox has a range of 1200 meters depending on acoustic and current conditions. The propulsion system on the Seafox includes four horizontal propellers and one vertical thruster. The entire propulsion system is battery powered. The maximum speed of the SeaFox is 6 knots. The SeaFox can be controlled with a remote or can be set on automatic and it will use radar and sonar to locate mines and other obstacles that it is tasked with clearing. The SeaFox has live CCTV feed and a high intensity searchlight. the CCTV feed it ran through the fiber-optic cable that is about 3000 meters long. The SeaFox was launched off the boat or ship using a crane. This crane is also how the SeaFox I was put back on the boat or ship. the warhead of the SeaFox is a fully shaped charge and has demonstrated effective against incendiary devices.

References

External links

 
 Atlas Elektronik - Minehunting and Autonomous Underwater Vehicle (AUV)
  US strengthens its military might in the Gulf
 AN/SLQ-60 SeaFox, navaldrones.com

Mine warfare countermeasures
Remotely operated underwater vehicles